Pasqua Lake is a organized hamlet on a lake of the same name in the Qu'Appelle Valley in the Canadian province of Saskatchewan.

History 
Pasqua Lake was incorporated as an organized hamlet on November 1, 1985. Pasqua Lake will incorporate as a resort village on January 1, 2024.

Geography 
The Organized Hamlet of Pasqua Lake includes the communities of Bence Beach, Bolingbrook Place, Braumberger Beach, Qu'Appelle Beach, Mapleview, Pasqua, Pasqua Lake, Spanier Beach, and Wambach.

Demographics 

Government 
The first council of the Resort Village of Pasqua Lake will consist of a mayor and three councillors. Its first election will occur on July 29, 2023.

See also 
List of hamlets in Saskatchewan
List of designated places in Saskatchewan
List of communities in Saskatchewan

References

Designated places in Saskatchewan
North Qu'Appelle No. 187, Saskatchewan
Organized hamlets in Saskatchewan
Division No. 6, Saskatchewan